Ignacio Martínez Trueba (born 11 April 1990), commonly known as Nacho Martínez is a Spanish professional footballer who plays as a forward who plays for CF Recambios Colón.

External links

1990 births
Living people
Association football forwards
Spanish footballers
Spanish expatriate footballers
Club Petrolero players
Club Atlético Ciclón players
UB Conquense footballers
Dreams Sports Club players
Tercera División players
Bolivian Primera División players
Hong Kong Premier League players
Spanish expatriate sportspeople in Bolivia
Spanish expatriate sportspeople in Hong Kong
Expatriate footballers in Bolivia
Expatriate footballers in Hong Kong